Justice is a 2023 documentary film about American Supreme Court Justice Brett Kavanaugh. The film was directed by Doug Liman. The film recounts the sexual assault allegations made against Kavanaugh, including the testimony of Christine Blasey Ford and Deborah Ramirez. It debuted on January 20, 2023 to a sold-out screening at the Sundance Film Festival. 

It features a never-before-heard audio recording made by Partnership for Public Service president and CEO Max Stier, a Yale colleague of Kavanaugh's, that corroborates Ramirez's charges and suggests that Kavanaugh violated another unnamed woman. Stier relays that he witnessed Kavanaugh with his pants down with a group of rowdy soccer players forcing a drunk female freshman to hold Kavanaugh's penis. Stier goes on to explain that he had heard from classmates about Ramirez's similar encounter with Kavanaugh, which she personally describes in the film.

The documentary also highlights the disproven narratives Kavanaugh advanced to sway public opinion and gain support of Republicans. It demonstrates how Kavanaugh and his team were aware of Ford and Ramirez's charges before they became public and preemptively countered them by planting alternate narratives with friends and acquaintances, showing Kavanaugh perjured himself during his confirmation hearings when he claimed only to have learned of Ramirez's accusation when he read about it in The New Yorker.

Reception 
On Rotten Tomatoes, the film has an approval rating of 67% based on 6 reviews, with an average rating of 7/10.

References

External links 

2023 films
2023 documentary films
Films directed by Doug Liman